Continental Airlines was an American airline headquartered in Houston, Texas. On May 3, 2010, the airline announced it had agreed to be acquired by UAL Corporation, with the transaction closing by September 17, 2010. Continental's air operator's certificate was later merged with the certificate of United Airlines on November 30, 2011, with both airlines merging into the same passenger service system on March 3, 2012.

As of March 2, 2012, prior to the airline's merger with United Airlines, Continental Airlines served 140 destinations, consisting of 62 domestic destinations and 78 international destinations. The list also includes destinations that Continental Airlines no longer served by the time of its integration.

List

References

External links
 Continental Airlines Route Maps 

Destinations
Lists of airline destinations